Anthony Feinstein (born December 14, 1956) is a Professor of Psychiatry at the University of Toronto and a neuropsychiatrist.  His research and clinical work focuses on people with multiple sclerosis, traumatic brain injury and Conversion Disorder. He has undertaken a number of studies investigating how front-line journalists are affected by their work covering war and man-made and natural disasters.

Education
Born in Johannesburg, South Africa, Feinstein received his medical degree from the University of Witwatersrand.  He completed his Psychiatry training at the Royal Free Hospital in London, England.  His MPhil and PhD degrees were obtained through the University of London.  After obtaining his PhD, he worked as a Senior Registrar at the Maudsley Hospital in London before taking up an appointment at the University of Toronto where he is currently a Professor of Psychiatry and a clinician scientist at the Sunnybrook Research Institute.

Multiple sclerosis
Over a three decade period, Feinstein's work has focused on determining brain imaging correlates of depression and pseudobulbar affect in people with MS.  He has also developed computerized methods of detecting cognitive dysfunction, with a particular emphasis on the use of distracters. A third strand to his MS work relates to defining the cognitive and functional neuroimaging changes associated with the use of cannabis (marijuana) in people with MS. His research has been funded by the Multiple Sclerosis Society of Canada, the Canadian Institute of Health Research and the Progressive MS Alliance.

Journalism work
In 2000 Feinstein obtained a grant from the Freedom Forum in Washington, D.C. to undertake the first study exploring how war can affect the psychological wellbeing of front-line journalists.  The results were subsequently published in the American Journal of Psychiatry.  Since then, he has completed studies investigating how journalists have been affected by the attacks of 9/11 in New York, the 2003 war in Iraq,  the drug wars in Mexico, the 2007 election violence and Al-Shabab attack on the Westgate Mall in Kenya, the Civil War in Syria  and state-sponsored violence directed towards the media in Iran.

Awards
Feinstein was awarded a Guggenheim Fellowship in 2000 to study mental health problems in post-apartheid Namibia.  A documentary, Journalists Under Fire, based on his work with war journalists, produced by him (and directed by Martyn Burke), was short-listed for an Academy Award and won a 2012 Peabody Award. His series of articles for the Globe & Mail on Conflict Photograph  was short-listed for a 2016 EPPY Award.

Publications
In Conflict, (New Namibia Books, 1998)
Michael Rabin, America's Virtuoso Violinist (Amadeus Press, 2005; second edition 2011)
Dangerous Lives: War and the Men and Women Who Report It (Thomas Allen Publishers, 2003)
Journalists Under Fire: the Psychological Hazards of Covering War (Johns Hopkins University Press, 2006)
The Clinical Neuropsychiatry of Multiple Sclerosis (Cambridge University Press, 1999; second edition 2007) 
Battle Scarred (Tafelberg Press, 2011)

References

External links

1956 births
Academic staff of the University of Toronto
People from Johannesburg
Living people
University of the Witwatersrand alumni
South African psychiatrists
The Globe and Mail columnists
South African emigrants to Canada
Alumni of the University of London